Language learning or language acquisition is the process by which humans acquire the capacity to use language.

Language learning may also refer to:

 Language Learning (journal), a scholarly journal covering language acquisition and learning
 Second language learning, the process of learning a second language and the scientific discipline studying that process
 Language education, the process and practice of teaching or learning a second or foreign language through study
Language processing, the mental process by which humans create and understand language

See also
 Language (disambiguation)
 Learn (disambiguation)